An aquila was a prominent symbol used in ancient Rome, especially as the standard of a Roman legion. A legionary known as an aquilifer, the "eagle-bearer", carried this standard. Each legion carried one eagle.

The eagle had quasi-religious importance to the Roman soldier, far beyond being merely a symbol of his legion. To lose a standard was extremely grave, and the Roman military went to great lengths both to protect a standard and to recover it if it were lost; after the annihilation of three legions in the Teutoburg Forest, the Romans spent decades retaliating for the defeat while also attempting to recover the three lost eagles.

No legionary eagles are known to have survived. However, other Roman eagles, either symbolizing imperial rule or used as funerary emblems, have been discovered.

History

The signa militaria were the Roman military ensigns or standards. The most ancient standard employed by the Romans is said to have been a handful (manipulus) of straw fixed to the top of a spear or pole. Hence the company of soldiers belonging to it was called a maniple. The bundle of hay or fern was soon succeeded by the figures of animals, of which Pliny the Elder (H.N. x.16) enumerates five: the eagle, the wolf, the ox with the man's head, the horse, and the boar. After the devastating Roman defeat at the Battle of Arausio against the Cimbri and Teutons the consul Gaius Marius undertook an extensive military reform in 104 BC in which the four quadrupeds were laid aside as standards, the eagle (Aquila) alone being retained. It was made of silver, or bronze, with outstretched wings, but was probably of relatively small size, since a standard-bearer (signifer) under Julius Caesar is said in circumstances of danger to have wrenched the eagle from its staff and concealed it in the folds of his girdle.

Under the later emperors the eagle was carried, as it had been for many centuries, with the legion, a legion being on that account sometimes called aquila (Hirt. Bell. Hisp. 30). Each cohort had for its own ensign the draco, which was woven on a square piece of cloth textilis anguis, elevated on a gilt staff, to which a cross-bar was adapted for the purpose, and carried by the draconarius.

Another figure used in the standards was a ball (orb), supposed to have been emblematic of the dominion of Rome over the world; and for the same reason a bronze figure of Victoria was sometimes fixed at the top of the staff, as we see it sculptured, together with small statues of Mars, on the Column of Trajan and the Arch of Constantine. Under the eagle or other emblem was often placed a head of the reigning emperor, which was to the army an object of worship or veneration. The name of the emperor, or of him who was acknowledged as emperor, was sometimes inscribed in the same situation. The pole used to carry the eagle had at its lower extremity an iron point (cuspis) to fix it in the ground and to enable the aquilifer in case of need to repel an attack.

The minor divisions of a cohort, called centuries, also each had an ensign, inscribed with the number both of the cohort and of the century. This, together with the diversities of the crests worn by the centurions, enabled each soldier to take his place with ease.

In the Arch of Constantine at Rome there are four sculptured panels near the top which exhibit a great number of standards and illustrate some of the forms here described. The first panel represents Trajan giving a king to the Parthians: seven standards are held by the soldiers. The second, containing five standards, represents the performance of the sacrifice called suovetaurilia.

When Constantine embraced Christianity, a figure or emblem of Christ, woven in gold upon the purple cloth, was substituted for the head of the emperor. This richly ornamented standard was called labarum. The labarum is still used today by the Eastern Orthodox Church in the Sunday service. The entry procession of the chalice whose contents will soon become holy communion is modeled after the procession of the standards of the Roman army.

Even after the adoption of Christianity as the Roman Empire's religion; the eagle continued to be used as a symbol by the Holy Roman Empire and the early Byzantine Empire although far more rarely and with a different meaning. In particular the double-headed eagle, despite strongly linking back to a Pagan symbol, became very popular among Christians. 

Since the movements of a body of troops and of every portion of it were regulated by the standards, all the evolutions, acts, and incidents of the Roman army were expressed by phrases derived from this circumstance. Thus signa inferre meant to advance, referre to retreat, and convertere to face about; efferre, or castris vellere, to march out of the camp; ad signa convenire, to re-assemble. Notwithstanding some obscurity in the use of terms, it appears that, whilst the standard of the legion was properly called aquila, those of the cohorts were in a special sense of the term called signa, their bearers being signiferi, and that those of the manipuli or smaller divisions of the cohort were denominated vexilla, their bearers being vexillarii. Also, those who fought in the first ranks of the legion, in front of the standards of the legion and cohorts, were called antesignani.

In military stratagems, it was sometimes necessary to conceal the standards. Although the Romans commonly considered it a point of honour to preserve their standards, in some cases of extreme danger the leader himself threw them among the ranks of the enemy in order to divert their attention or to animate his own soldiers. A wounded or dying standard-bearer delivered it, if possible, into the hands of his general, from whom he had received it signis acceptis.

Lost aquilae
Battles where the Aquilae were lost, units that lost the Aquilae and the fate of the Aquilae:
73–71 BC – five Aquilae were lost over the course of the Third Servile War, recovered upon the defeat of Spartacus in 71 BC.
53 BC – the defeat of Marcus Licinius Crassus at the Battle of Carrhae by the Parthians. Several Legions (returned in 20 BC).
49–45 BC – loss of Aquilae from legions of Aulus Gabinius and Publius Vatinius to the Dalmatians during Caesar's Civil War. (returned in 23 BC).
 45 BC – loss of Aquilae in Spain during Caesar's Civil War. (returned in about 25 BC during the Cantabrian Wars).
40 BC – defeat of Decidius Saxa by a combined Roman–Parthian force under Quintus Labienus near Antioch. Several Legions (at least one Aquila was returned in 20 BC). 
36 BC – the defeat of Oppius Statianus by the Parthians during Antony's Parthian War. Two Legions (returned in 20 BC). 
(19 BC – degradation of a legion during the Cantabrian Wars by removal of the name "Augustan Legion". The actual reason is unknown)
17 BC – defeat of Marcus Lollius by Germanic tribes in Gallia in the Clades Lolliana. Legio V Macedonica (returned in 16 BC)
9 – Battle of the Teutoburg Forest in Germania. Legio XVII, Legio XVIII, and Legio XIX (two recaptured by Germanicus in 15 and 16, the last recaptured by Publius Gabinius Secundus in 41).
66 – First Jewish–Roman War. Legio XII Fulminata (fate uncertain).
70 –  destruction of Legio V Alaudae, Legio XV Primigenia and Legio XVI Gallica during the Revolt of the Batavi near Xanten. (fate unknown)
86 – defeat of Cornelius Fuscus in the First Battle of Tapae during Domitian's Dacian War. Legio V Alaudae or Praetorian Guard (recaptured during Trajan's Dacian Wars in 101 or 102).
(132 – disputed loss of Legio XXII Deiotariana or Legio IX Hispana in the Bar Kochva Revolt)
161 – defeat of Marcus Sedatius Severianus by the Parthians at Elegeia in Armenia. Possibly the Legio IX Hispana or Legio XXII Deiotariana.
260 – defeat and capture of Emperor Valerian by the Sassanids in the Battle of Edessa. (fate unknown)
378 – defeat of Emperor Valens by the Goths in the Battle of Adrianople. (fate unknown)

Arch of Constantine

Arch of Constantine showing carvings of aquila

Ancient imagery

See also
 Silchester eagle

References

Further reading

 Signa Militaria", by James Yates, in the public domain A Dictionary of Greek and Roman Antiquities (pp. 1044–1046)
 Kai M. Töpfer: Signa Militaria. Die römischen Feldzeichen in Republik und Prinzipat, Mainz, Verlag Schnell + Steiner 2011, 
 The Eagle of the Ninth, a novel by Rosemary Sutcliff

External links
 Picture of Aquila on tomb sculpture at Livis.org
 

Ancient Roman military standards
Eagles
Heraldic eagles
Imperial Eagle
Iconography